Põder is an Estonian surname (meaning moose), and may refer to:

 Andres Põder (born 1949), retired archbishop
 Anu Põder (1947–2013), sculptor
 Märt Põder (born 1979), philosopher, freedom of information activist, presenter, publicist and translator
 Raimond Põder (born 1903), footballer
 Rein Põder (1943–2018), writer
 Riina Põder (1939–2014), pianist, also known as Riina Gerretz

Estonian-language surnames